Kerri Kenney-Silver (born January 20, 1970) is an American actress, comedian, writer, singer, and musician. She is best known for starring as Trudy Wiegel on the mockumentary series Reno 911! and previously for her sketch comedy work on MTV's The State, where she was the show's lone female cast member. She has also appeared with recurring roles on sitcoms such as Superstore, 2 Broke Girls, Love, and The Ellen Show. In the mid-late 1990s, Kenney fronted the all-female rock band Cake Like.

Early life
Kenney-Silver was born in Fort Wayne, Indiana, and was raised in Westport, Connecticut, and New York City. She is the daughter of Carol Kenney and Larry Kenney, an actor who is best known as the voice of Lion-O in ThunderCats.

Career
During the early 1990s, Kenney-Silver was the lead singer and bass guitarist of the indie rock band Cake Like.

Kenney-Silver attended New York University where she joined the sketch comedy group The New Group which ultimately became The State. The group was picked up for a self-titled sketch comedy show on MTV, The State, which aired between 1993 and 1995.

After the show's completion, Kenney-Silver continued working with her fellow troupe members on other projects. In 1996, she co-wrote and starred in Viva Variety, a parody of variety shows that aired on Comedy Central for two seasons.

In 2000, Kenney-Silver voiced the character of "Gravitina" in the children's cartoon Buzz Lightyear of Star Command. She has since done a number of voices on the Nickelodeon series Invader Zim. Additionally, she starred as a regular on The Ellen Show, which aired until 2001. She later found success with Reno 911!, a series on Comedy Central that parodied police reality shows like COPS, which also featured former members of the State Thomas Lennon, Ben Garant, and Joe Lo Truglio. The show was originally cancelled in 2009 after six seasons. Kenney-Silver also appeared on the TV series Still Standing.

In July 2008, Kenney-Silver made her debut as "Dame Delilah", the title character in the web series Dame Delilah's Fantasy Ranch & Gift Shoppe. On the site, various comedians give video testimony as characters working at or otherwise visiting the fictional Cat House. Kenney-Silver created the series and it was produced by her husband, Steve Silver, and Jared Mazzaschi.

Kenney-Silver was among the cast of Suburban Shootout, a pilot episode directed and executive produced by Barry Sonnenfeld for HBO. The pilot filmed in The Hamptons, Long Island, in September 2008. HBO has not announced if it will pick up the pilot for a season. The pilot is based on the British comedy of the same name.

Kenney-Silver has appeared in films such as All About Steve, Reno 911!: Miami, National Lampoon's Pledge This!, Balls of Fury, The Ten, Role Models, and Wanderlust.

In December 2011 it was announced that Kenney-Silver and actress Jamie Denbo were developing a new series for Comedy Central called "Dame Delilah’s Rabbit Hole Ranch" based on a web series they previously created and starred in.

In 2015 she began voicing the character of Miriam in the Nickelodeon series Harvey Beaks.

From 2016 to 2018, she played the recurring role of Syd (the neighbor of Gillian Jacobs’s character) in the Netflix comedy series Love. She currently recurs on the NBC sitcom Superstore, playing the role of Jerusha Sturgis, Glenn's wife, who was introduced in the third season.

In 2020, Kenney-Silver reprised her role as Deputy Trudy Wiegel in the seventh season of Reno 911! which aired on Quibi. She also appeared in the 2021 Paramount+ movie, Reno 911! The Hunt for QAnon. The eighth season of the series, now titled Reno 911! Defunded, premiered on The Roku Channel in February 2022.

Personal life
Kenney-Silver is married to cinematographer Steven V. Silver. They have a son who was born in 2005.

Filmography

Film

Television

References

External links
 

1970 births
Actresses from Connecticut
American women guitarists
American film actresses
American rock singers
American television actresses
American television writers
American voice actresses
Comedians from Connecticut
Women bass guitarists
Women rock singers
Living people
New York University alumni
People from Westport, Connecticut
American sketch comedians
American women comedians
American women television writers
21st-century American women singers
Screenwriters from Connecticut
21st-century American singers
21st-century American comedians
21st-century American bass guitarists
21st-century American screenwriters